Marion Bethel (born 31 July 1953) is an attorney, poet, essayist, filmmaker, human and gender rights activist, and writer from Nassau, The Bahamas.

Bethel is best known for her anthologies of poems, Guanahani, My Love and Bougainvillea Ringplay. Her work has appeared in publications including The Caribbean Writer , The Massachusetts Review and Junction, an anthology of Bahamian writing. She is also recognized for her documentary film on the women's suffrage movement in The Bahamas called Womanish Ways: Freedom, Human Rights & Democracy 1934 to 1962, which received the 2012 Award in Documentary at the Urban Suburban International Film Festivall. Her passion in her involvement in the Women's Movement in the Caribbean has awarded her the 11th Caribbean Community (CARICOM) award in 2014. Bethel has also received the Casa de Las Americas Prize for poetry, and has spoken at many events, including The IV International Poetry Festival of Granada.

She currently resides with her husband Alfred Sears in The Bahamas, where she is a managing partner at Sears & Co.  She now focuses on political activism in civil society in The Bahamas and began serving on the United Nations Committee on the Elimination of Discrimination Against Women (CEDAW) on 1 January 2017.

Early life and education 
After receiving her Bachelor of Arts degree in Spanish with honors at McGill University, Bethel received her Bachelor of Arts degree in law at Wolfson College, Cambridge University. While in England, she pursued her certificate of legal education at the Council of Legal Education and later pursued her Master of Arts Degree at Columbia University. Before taking her bar examinations in 1987, Bethel spent a summer writing a collections of poems later to be published as Guanahani, My Love (originally Guanahani, mi amor: Y otros poemas) which won the prestigious Casa de Las Americas Prize of Poetry, making her one of the few Caribbean writers to receive this award.

Later life 
While working on her first manuscript Guanahani, My Love, Bethel attended the Caribbean Writers Summer Institute at the University of Miami in 1991, where she worked with two well known Barbadian writers, George Lamming and Kamau Braithwaite. Following the death of Southern Christian Leadership Conference founder and civil rights pioneer Evelyn Lowery, Bethel's film Womanish Ways: Freedom, Human Rights & Democracy 1934 to 1962 was showcased at Spelman College and she met some of Atlanta's most influential African-American entrepreneurs and activists, in addition to former vice-president of Tyler Perry Studios and CEO/ President of Bobbcat Films Rogger Bobb. Later that week, billionaire Dr Bill Allen treated Mrs. Bethel and The Bahamas Consul General to lunch, during which Consul General Randy Rolle stated that people like Marion Bethel have much to contribute as it pertains to sharing the history of The Bahamas.

Career 
After passing her bar exams in September 1984, Bethel was admitted as an attorney-at-law to the Bar of England and Wales in 1985 and The Bahamas in 1986 while practicing administrative law, company law, commercial law, contracts, conveyancing, immigration law, insurance law, and matrimonial law. From 1896 to 1994, she then went on to work in the Office of the Attorney General; in 1997, she was named the Alice Proskauer Fellow at the Bunting Institute of Radcliffe College, Harvard University, while also writing Bougainvillea Ringplay during her spare time. In June 2005, Bethel began a retreat for African-American poets as a three-part poetry workshop titled "Cave Canem", held at the University of Pittsburgh. In 2012, she directed Womanish Ways: Freedom, Human Rights & Democracy, the Women’s Suffrage Movement in The Bahamas 1948 to 1962, a documentary on the struggle to gain women the right to vote in The Bahamas.  Her passion for the Women's Movement in the Caribbean and The Bahamas became evident from this movie and she then received widespread support from many African, European, and Asian countries. Bethel was elected to serve on the Committee of the United Nations Convention on the Elimination of All Forms of Discrimination Against Women from 1 January 2017 to 31 December 2019.  She currently works as a managing partner at Sears & Co. and is working on a third anthology of poetry and a novel.

Bibliography

Writing 
Before finishing her bar examinations, Bethel spent a full summer writing a draft of Guanahani, My Love and published her first book in 1994, later to be republished by House of Nehesi Publishers in 2009. Her second book, Bougainvillea Ringplay, was published by Peepal Tree Press in 2009 and she is currently working on a third poetry collection and novel. She has been a guest star at various international events including the Caribbean Women Writers and Scholars Conference, Florida International University, in April 1996, the IV International Poetry Festival of Granada, the Miami International Book Fair in November 1997, the Caribbean Women Writers Series at Duke University in February 2002 and the XVI International Poetry Festival of Medellin in June 2006 in Medellin, Colombia. Additionally, House of Nehesi Publishers invited her as a guest poet and workshop presenter to their 5th Annual St. Martin BookFair in May 2007. Her work has been featured in The Caribbean Writer, Volume 8, Moving Beyond, and in the anthologies of Bahamian poetry Junction and From the Shallow Seas. Bethel is also a contributor to New Daughters of Africa (2019), edited by Margaret Busby.

Films 
Bethel acted as Ms. Wells in the 2008 movie Rain and is better known for the documentary film she directed on the women's suffrage movement in The Bahamas. Entitled Womanish Ways: Freedom, Human Rights & Democracy 1934 to 1962, this documentary was showcased by Bahamas Consulate Office of Atlanta at Spelman College after the death of Southern Christian Leadership Conference founder and civil rights pioneer Evelyn Lowery.

Awards 
In July 1991, Bethel received a James Michener Fellowship in the Department of English at the University of Miami by the Caribbean Writers Summer Institute. She was one of few Caribbean writers to receive the Casa de Las Americas Prize for her collection of poems in Guanahani, mi amor: Y otros poemas. Additionally, Bethel is also the first Bahamian to receive the CARICOM award and was given this award in 2014 for her contribution towards gender justice and culture and the socio-economic development of the Caribbean. One way she has contributed to gender justice and culture is through her documentary Womanish Ways: Freedom, Human Rights & Democracy 1934 to 1962, which received the 2012 Award in Documentary at the Urban Suburban International Film Festival in Philadelphia. despite interventions on behalf of female members of parliament Hope Strachan and Loretta Butler. However, representative for Englerston Glenys Hanna-Martin states that Bethel's documentary was a "beautiful, powerful piece of work.".

References

Sources
Bethel, Marion. Guanahani, My Love. Philipsburg, St. Martin, Caribbean: House of Nehesi, 2009, . Print. 
Farmer, Sonia. "Profile: Marion Bethel", The Nassau Guardian, 5 March 2012. Web. 5 April 2017.
Wells, Ricardo. "Marion Bethel 'ready' for Responsibilities as Husband Challenges for PLP Leadership", Tribune 242. Ellington, 11 August 2016. Web. 6 April 2017.

External links 
 "Essays on Life: On the Mind". www.nicobethel.net. Retrieved 28 April 2017.
 "Judge Spotlight - Marion Bethel - Bocas Lit Fest". Bocas Lit Fest. 20 April 2013. Retrieved 1 May 2017.
 "Marion Bethel". caribbeanintransit.com. Retrieved 1 May 2017.
 "Marion Bethel (Bahamas, 1953) | World Poetry Movement".www.wpm2011.org. Retrieved 30 April 2017. Etc..

1953 births
Living people
Bahamian poets
Bahamian women writers
Alumni of the University of Cambridge
Bahamian lawyers
University of Valencia alumni
McGill University alumni
Columbia University alumni
20th-century poets
Bahamian women poets
20th-century women writers
20th-century Bahamian lawyers